The Guyana national rugby sevens team is a minor international sevens side.  They competed in the IRB Sevens World Series for the first time at the 2010 USA Sevens.  Although the team was outscored 158-31 over five games, they earned a surprise 12-12 draw with World Series core member France in group play.

Guyana also qualified for the 2010 Commonwealth Games.

Tournament History

Commonwealth Games

Rugby Americas North Sevens

Current squad
Squad to 2012 Hong Kong Sevens:
Rupert Giles
Richard Staglon
Walter George
Vallon Adams
Theo Henry
Kevin McKenzie
Elwin Chase
Ronald Mayers
Ryan Gonsalves (c)
Christopher Singh
Claudius Butts
Rickford Cummings

2010 USA Sevens

Pool A
{| class="wikitable" style="text-align: center;"
|-
!width="200"|Team
!width="40"|Pld
!width="40"|W
!width="40"|D
!width="40"|L
!width="40"|PF
!width="40"|PA
!width="40"|+/-
!width="40"|Pts
|-
|align=left| 
|3||3||0||0||92||19||+73||9
|-
|align=left| 
|3||2||0||1||78||7||+61||7
|-
|align=left| 
|3||0||1||2||24||81||–57||4
|-
|align=left| 
|3||0||1||2||12||94||–82||4
|}

Shield

2012 Hong Kong Sevens

Pool F

Ranking Matches

See also 

 Rugby Americas North
 Rugby union in Guyana

References

External links
 Guyana at IRB.com
 Guyana at RugbyData.com

Rugby union in Guyana
National rugby sevens teams
National sports teams of Guyana